The Big Durian is a nickname given to more than one place:

 Esplanade – Theatres on the Bay, Singapore, which has two large ovoid buildings that resemble durians
 The official nickname of Jakarta, the capital of Indonesia
 The Big Durian (film)
 The Big Durian (sculpture), a sculpture located at the centre of the roundabout in Kampot, Cambodia

See also
 Durian